Louis Tauzin (July 21, 1842, Barsac, Gironde—August 30, 1915, Royan) was a French landscape painter, poster artist, and chromolithographer.

Education and career

Louis Tauzin studied at the  under . He specialized in landscapes and seascapes. In the 45 years from 1867 to 1912, he presented 65 works at 37 of the annual Paris Salons. From 1891 he also exhibited regularly at the salon of Toulouse. At expositions in Versailles, he was awarded silver medals in 1884 and 1885.

Along with painting, Tauzin had a highly successful career as a commercial artist, eventually becoming chef d'atelier (head of studio) at Champenois, one of the most prominent chromolithography houses in Paris. He produced many posters in lithographic format for railway companies, vacation destinations, various major brands, and the publisher .

In 1889, Tauzin illustrated the covers of Paris-Revue, often with scenes from the Exposition Universelle. That same year, he produced a series of lithographs on the theme of La tombée de nuit (nightfall).

From 1900 to 1910, he painted a series of watercolors of spa towns, including Saint-Alban-les-Eaux, Évian, and Vichy, which were reproduced as postcards.

From 1905 to 1912, he provided humorous cartoons for the periodical L'Enfant, published by the Société Protectrice de l'Enfance (child protection society).

Fiercely anti-German and pro-French during World War I, Tauzin drew the masthead art and wrote a regular column for the periodical L'Antiboche and made drawings for a series of propaganda postcards published 1914-1916. (Boche is derogatory French slang for a German, especially a German soldier.)

Personal life; death

Tauzin married Marie Marguerite Zimmerman on August 29, 1871 in Saint-Avold, Moselle. Their elder son, Henri-Alexis Tauzin, studied under Jean-Louis Pascal and became an architect; their younger son, Louis-Eugène Tauzin, studied under Jules Coutan and became a sculptor.

Around 1880, Louis Tauzin moved to Meudon, in the area overlooking the Seine known as Bellevue ("beautiful view"). His neighbors included Louis-Maurice Boutet de Monvel and Édouard Manet. Tauzin's paintings of the views from Bellevue were among his most notable works. The house where he lived, at 4 Sentier des Pierres-Blanches, was destroyed by a bomb during World War II. Today, the largest public collection of his paintings is held by the Musée d'art et d'histoire de Meudon.

In the last year of his life, Tauzin split his time between Paris and a villa called Les Bessons outside the town of Royan on the French Atlantic coast. Shortly after writing his last column for L'Antiboche, published August 15, 1915, Tauzin set about hanging a rope at the well at Les Bessons. A stone cover on the well gave way beneath him and he fell 25 meters. With a broken ankle, a badly damaged foot, and torn hands, he barely escaped drowning by clinging to a pipe. Neighbors, called by his wife, threw ropes to him. He was pulled from the well after much effort, complaining of severe pain. Tauzin succumbed to his injuries on 30 August, 1915, at the age of 73.

Gallery

Paintings

Posters

Lithographic series La tombée de nuit, 1889

Spa postcards

World War I propaganda

Tauzin in museums
Works by Tauzin (paintings unless otherwise noted) are held in these collections in France:

Tauzin at auction
A 21st-century record for a work by Tauzin was set by a 41 x 29-inch lithographic poster, Les Vosges (made for Chemins de fer de l'est in 1913), auctioned at Christie's London in 2004 for 8,963 GBP (16,483 USD).

References

Sources
 Guillin, Anne and Blin, Sylvie. Les Peintres et les Hauts-de-Seine, Sogemo, 1991.
 Villadier, Francis, editor. Les Peintres de la «belle boucle» de la Seine: 1800-1930 (exhibition catalogue), Issy-les-Moulineaux/Meudon: Ville d'Issy-les-Moulineau, 2015; pp. 20, 65, 67, 96, 97.

External links

 Illustrations by Tauzin, grouped in categories: travel and other posters; the lithographic series La tombée de nuit (nightfall); Paris-Revue covers; scenic postcards of spa towns (from watercolors); anti-German WWI postcards; and cartoons of children for the periodical L'Enfant.
 Tauzin posters at Gallica.
 Louis Tauzin at the BnF general catalogue.

1842 births
1915 deaths
People from Gironde
French landscape painters
French poster artists
World War I propaganda